The Black Hill transmitting station is a facility for FM and TV broadcasting at Black Hill, on Duntilland Road, Salsburgh, North Lanarkshire, Scotland which is near the town of Airdrie.

History

Construction
It was built by BICC for the Independent Television Authority (ITA), in 1957 and is now owned and operated by Arqiva.

The present mast is the second to have been built at the site. The first, built in 1957 brought the Independent Television service to Central Scotland and opened for service on 31 August 1957. However, complex anomalies in the behaviour of the antenna caused its performance to be less than predicted, and the decision was taken in 1959 to replace the mast with a higher structure and a more conventional aerial on the outside of the mast rather than inside as had been the case with the first mast. The original 750 foot mast was then dismantled and later used at the Selkirk transmitting station in the Borders where it still stands.

Transmission
The transmitter was originally a B group but with the advent of Digital two of the 6 muxes then went out of band and required an E group (or wideband) aerial if reception of these was required. At DSO in 2011 it returned to the B group though with the eventual addition of MUXES 7 and 8 it technically became a K group. At Blackhill's 700 MHz clearance in Sept 2018 it more or less returned to the B group, but, because its output has (since DSO) been fairly close to the B group at all times a B, K or E group (or a wideband) aerial would work for most areas (see graph).
Black Hill has the fifth greatest population coverage with a figure of around 2.5 million.

Between 1961 and the end of the 405 line ITV service in 1985, the Black Hill aerial had the highest effective radiated power of any transmitter in the ITV network with 475 kW radiated towards Dundee.

In the summer of 2008, work began on the construction of a second 306.6 m mast close to the original. This mast carries the new full-power Digital TV (DTT) services since digital switchover became effective at Black Hill in June 2011. The original mast will now be shortened in height and will radiate FM and DAB services only.

In June 2011, Black Hill became the final transmitter in Scotland to switch off analogue television. BBC Two Scotland was turned off first on 8 June, and the remaining four closed on 22 June.

Services listed by frequency

Analogue radio (FM VHF)

† This signal is largely radiated towards Glasgow.

Digital radio (DAB)

Digital television

Before switchover

Analogue television
Analogue television was broadcast from Black Hill until 22 June 2011. BBC2 Scotland was previously switched off on 8 June.

See also
 Kirk o'Shotts transmitting station
 List of masts
 List of tallest structures in the United Kingdom
 Salsburgh

References

External links
 Info on Black Hill transmitter including co-receivable channels
 Blackhill transmitter at MB21
 http://skyscraperpage.com/diagrams/?b54127
 Black Hill Transmitter at thebigtower.com

Transmitter sites in Scotland
Buildings and structures in North Lanarkshire